Hornbarger Store is a historic general store located at Vicker, Montgomery County, Virginia.  It was built in 1910–1911, and is a two-story, three-bay, rectangular brick commercial building.  It has a parapet shed roof, segmentally arched one-over-one double-hung sash windows, and wood bracketed cornices.  Also on the property is a contributing board-and-batten hipped roof outbuilding.

It was listed on the National Register of Historic Places in 1989.

References

Commercial buildings on the National Register of Historic Places in Virginia
Commercial buildings completed in 1911
Buildings and structures in Montgomery County, Virginia
National Register of Historic Places in Montgomery County, Virginia
1911 establishments in Virginia